Banksia occidentalis, commonly known as the red swamp banksia, is a species of shrub or small tree that is endemic to the south coast of Western Australia. It has smooth bark, linear, sparsely serrated leaves, golden flowers in a cylindrical spike, and later up to sixty follicles in each spike.

Description
Up to sixty follicles form in each spike, the old flowers having fallen.

Taxonomy and naming
Banksia occidentalis was first formally described in 1810 by Robert Brown in Transactions of the Linnean Society of London. The specific epithet (occidentalis) is a Latin word meaning "western", referring to the distribution of this species relative to the related B. spinulosa. George placed this species in section Oncostylis, series Spicigerae.

Distribution and habitat
Red swamp banksia occurs along the south coast of Western Australia between Augusta and Cape Arid National Park where it grows in shrubland or woodland, usually on the edges of swamps but sometimes also on coastal dunes.

Ecology
A 1980 field study at Cheyne beach showed it to be pollinated by the New Holland honeyeater and white-cheeked honeyeater.

Conservation status
This banksia is listed as "not threatened" by the Western Australian Government Department of Parks and Wildlife.

Use in horticulture
Seeds do not require any treatment, and take 21 to 47 days to germinate. The species was observed to be in cultivation in England in the gardens of Chiswick House in 1834.

References

occidentalis
Eudicots of Western Australia
Taxa named by Robert Brown (botanist, born 1773)
Plants described in 1810